The men's tournament of the 2015 Canadian Senior Curling Championships was held from March 21 to 28 at the Thistle Curling Club in Edmonton, Alberta. The winners represented Canada at the 2016 World Senior Curling Championships.

Teams

Round-robin standings

Pool A

Pool B

Round-robin results

Pool A

Draw 2

Draw 4

Draw 6

Draw 8

Draw 10

Draw 12

Draw 14

Pool B

Draw 2

Draw 4

Draw 6

Draw 8

Draw 10

Draw 12

Draw 14

Placement Round

Seeding Pool

Standings
After Round-robin standings

Draw 15

Draw 16

Draw 19

Draw 22

Championship Pool

Championship Pool Standings
Including games against other Championship Pool teams from Round Robin

Draw 15

Draw 17

Draw 20

Draw 22

Draw 23

Playoffs

Semifinals

Bronze medal game

Final

References

External links

2015 in Canadian curling
Canadian Senior Curling Championships